Ayub Khan Din (born 1961) is a British writer and actor. He wrote the BAFTA, BIFA and London Film Critics Circle award-winning film East Is East (1999), adapted from his 1996 Olivier-nominated play of the same name. His 2008 comedy play Rafta, Rafta... won the Olivier Award. He went on to write the film sequel West Is West (2010). On television, he created the Channel 4 comedy-drama Ackley Bridge (2017–2022).

As an actor, Khan Din's roles include Sammy in Hanif Kureishi's film Sammy and Rosie Get Laid in (1987), Hanif Ruparell in the soap opera Coronation Street (1992–1993), and Ravi Shah in the ITV series London Bridge (1996).

Early life
Khan Din was born to a Pakistani father and English mother and lived in Salford. Upon leaving school, he studied drama at the Salford College of Technology. When he completed his course in 1982, he then left to study acting at Mountview Academy of Theatre Arts, London graduating in 1984. He then  pursued a career in acting, initially in theatre.

Personal life
Ayub Khan Din is married to British-Nigerian actress Buki Armstrong. The couple have two daughters and currently reside in Granada, Spain. Khan Din's brothers are Lee Din and Rasshied Din. Lee is a make-up artist in the TV industry and tutor at the School of Make-up in Manchester, and Rassheid is, among other things, the designer of the Diana, Princess of Wales, memorial centre at Althorp.

Career
As an actor, Khan Din appeared in some 20 British films and TV series in the late 1980s and he was cast in the co-lead role of Sammy in Hanif Kureishi's film Sammy and Rosie Get Laid (1987) with Frances Barber. Throughout the late 1980s and early 1990s, he worked extensively on the stage debuting at the Royal National Theatre. He was one of the leading characters in the film The Idiot (1992).

In the mid 1990s, Khan Din began writing plays, the first was East is East (1996) first produced by Tamasha Theatre Company in co-production with the Royal Court and Birmingham Repertory Theatre. It is often cited as one of the key works to bring Asian culture to mainstream British audiences. The play, published by Nick Hern Books, was nominated for a 1998 Laurence Olivier Theatre Award for Best New Comedy. The play draws very much from Khan-Din's own childhood in Salford, where he grew up in a large family with a British Pakistani father and a white British mother. They had ten children. The marriage was abusive and violent but his father nursed his mother when she was dying of Alzheimer's disease. After her death, he returned to Pakistan but died before the first performance of the play. In interviews, Khan-Din has said that the young boy Sajid Khan is a self-portrait, and that Sajid's parents are very exact portraits of his own parents.

The film version of East is East (1999) stars Om Puri as the father and Linda Bassett as the mother. Khan Din adapted his own play, and won both a British Independent Film Award and a London Critics' Circle Film Award for his screenplay, as well as being nominated for two BAFTA Awards for Best Adapted Screenplay and the Carl Foreman Award for the Most Promising Newcomer, he was also nominated for a European Film Award for Best European Screenwriter.

In 2000, East is East received two further BAFTA nominations that year for Best Film and the Alexander Korda Award for Best British Film the latter of which it won.

In 2007, Khan Din's new comedy play Rafta, Rafta... an adaptation from the 1963 Bill Naughton play, All in Good Time. It is set in the working class English town of Bolton, and examines a story of marital difficulties within an immigrant Indian family it opened on the Lyttelton stage of the National Theatre in London directed by Nicholas Hytner it won the Laurence Olivier Award for Best New Comedy in 2008. The play debuted in New York Off-Broadway at the Theatre Row New Group Theatre in May 2008, and has since then debuted at the HuM Theatre in Singapore in May 2010, in Mumbai at the Indian Institute of Technology in 2011 and more recently at the Old Globe Theatre, in San Diego in 2012.

The sequel to East is East, West is West (2010) premiered at the Toronto International Film Festival and London International Film Festival's. The film's story is set in 1976, five years after the events in East is East. Father George Khan is worried that his youngest son, Sajid, now 15, is turning his back on his Pakistani heritage, so he decides to take him for a visit to Pakistan. A film adaptation of Rafta, Rafta... was released under the title All in Good Time (2012) directed by Nigel Cole and with Reece Ritchie in the leading role. 

In 2013, Khan Din adapted E R Braithwaite's autobiographical novel To Sir, With Love for the stage as part of Royal & Derngate, Northampton's Made In Northampton season. The play was directed by Mark Babych and starred Matthew Kelly and Ansu Kabia.

In 2014, Khan Din starred in a revival of East is East, at the Trafalgar Studios, London playing the role of the father "George" alongside Jane Horrocks .

Selected filmography

Writing credits

Awards and nominations

BAFTA Awards
1 win and 4 nominations

British Independent Film Awards
1 win and 1 nomination

London Film Critics' Circle
1 win and 1 nomination

Laurence Olivier Awards
1 win, 2 nominations

European Film Awards
1 nomination

References

External links

Interview with Ayub Khan-din about "East is East", from 1999

1961 births
English dramatists and playwrights
Pakistani dramatists and playwrights
English male film actors
Muhajir people
English people of Pakistani descent
Male actors from Salford
Living people
English male dramatists and playwrights
English television writers
English screenwriters
English male screenwriters
Alumni of the Mountview Academy of Theatre Arts
British film actors of Pakistani descent
20th-century English male actors
21st-century English male actors